The Lakeland Subdivision is a CSX Transportation rail line in Florida.  It runs along CSX's A Line from just west of Lakeland and heads west through Plant City to the community of Mango in Hillsborough County, just east of Tampa.  

The east end of line is at Lakeland Junction, where it continues west from the Carters Subdivision of the A Line.  It also connects to the Vitis Subdivision at Lakeland Junction.  In Mango, the line connects with the Tampa Terminal Subdivision.

The Lakeland Subdivision runs through the middle of Plant City, where it crosses CSX's other main line, the S Line (Yeoman Subdivision).  This junction, known as Plant City Interlocking, is a particularly busy junction since all trains to and from Tampa must pass through this point.  A train viewing platform is located at the junction for rail enthusiasts to observe passing trains.  The platform is part of the Robert W. Willaford Railroad Museum which operates in the Plant City Union Depot.

Amtrak's Silver Star runs the Lakeland Subdivision round-trip twice a day into Tampa.  Freight traffic on the Lakeland Subdivision includes local freight as well as traffic into and out of Winston Yard, which is the east entrance to CSX's routes in the Bone Valley phosphate region.

History

The Lakeland Subdivision first began service in 1884 and was built as part of Henry B. Plant's South Florida Railroad.  The South Florida Railroad was absorbed by the Atlantic Coast Line Railroad (ACL) in 1902 and it became part ACL's main line.  The Atlantic Coast Line became part of CSX Transportation by 1986.

See also
 List of CSX Transportation lines

References

CSX Transportation lines
Florida railroads
Rail infrastructure in Florida
Transportation in Hillsborough County, Florida
Transportation in Polk County, Florida